Langavatnet is a lake in Ullensvang Municipality in Vestland county, Norway. The  lake lies about  straight east of the town of Odda.  The lake has a dam at the north end to regulate the water level for the purposes of hydroelectric power generation.  The water of the lake previously flowed north to create the large Ringedalsfossen waterfall which now only flows when the lake gets too full.  The water flows over the falls into the lake Ringedalsvatnet (which has a dam at its western end) before flowing through the short river Tysso which empties into the Sørfjorden.

See also
List of lakes in Norway

References

Lakes of Vestland
Ullensvang
Reservoirs in Norway